R Carinae is a double star in the southern constellation of Carina. The brighter component is a variable star that can be viewed with the naked eye at peak brightness, but is usually too faint to be seen without a telescope, having an apparent visual magnitude that fluctuates around 7.43. This star is located at a distance of approximately 1,300 light years from the Sun based on parallax, and is drifting further away with a radial velocity of +28 km/s.

The main component is an aging red giant star on the asymptotic giant branch with a stellar classification of M6/7pe.

The companion is a magnitude 11.30 star at an angular separation of  along a position angle of 132° from the main star, as of 2015.

References 

M-type giants
Emission-line stars
Mira variables
Double stars

Carina (constellation)
Durchmusterung objects
082901
046806
3816
Carinae, R